Jamuna Devi  (29 November 1929 – 24 September 2010) was a leader of Indian National Congress party from Madhya Pradesh. She was a member of Madhya Pradesh Legislative Assembly and served as the leader of Opposition and deputy chief minister of the state. She was elected as Lok Sabha member from Jhabua  (1962–67). She was also the member of Rajya Sabha from 1978 to 1981.

Career 

She was member of the first assembly of the Madhya Bharat State from 1952 to 1957 then was Member of Parliament form Jhabua from 1962 to 1967 as well as Rajya Sabha Member from 1978 to 1981.

She was junior minister in Governments  Arjun Singh, Motilal Vora and Shyama Charan Shukla but was inducted into cabinet under Digvijaya Singh and was later promoted to Deputy Chief Minister of Madhya Pradesh in 1998, thus becoming first woman deputy chief minister.

When Indian National Congress lost power in 2003, she was named as leader of Opposition and remained in the post until 2010.

Death 

Jamuna Devi died on September 24, 2010 in Indore after suffering a long battle against cancer.

References

1929 births
2008 deaths
Indian National Congress politicians from Madhya Pradesh
Lok Sabha members from Madhya Pradesh
Rajya Sabha members from Madhya Pradesh
People from Dhar district
India MPs 1962–1967
Leaders of the Opposition in Madhya Pradesh
Deputy Chief Ministers of Madhya Pradesh
Madhya Pradesh MLAs 1985–1990
Madhya Pradesh MLAs 1993–1998
Madhya Pradesh MLAs 1998–2003
Madhya Pradesh MLAs 2003–2008
Madhya Pradesh MLAs 2008–2013
Women members of the Madhya Pradesh Legislative Assembly
20th-century Indian women politicians
20th-century Indian politicians
21st-century Indian women politicians
21st-century Indian politicians
Women members of the Lok Sabha
Women members of the Rajya Sabha
Women deputy chief ministers of Indian states